JLG may refer to:

Jalgaon Airport, Jalgaon, India, IATA airport code
Jean-Luc Godard, French film-maker, or his autobiographical film JLG/JLG, autoportrait de décembre
Jean-Louis Gassée, founder of Be Inc., creator of BeOS, and an executive at Apple Computer from 1981 to 1990
JLG Industries, American manufacturer of high-level access equipment
JLG-43 Radar, height-finding radar
Jet Lag Gemini, American rock band
Jive Label Group
Juan Luis Guerra, a Grammy-winning Dominican singer, songwriter, and producer who has sold over 30 million records worldwide.